Pasiene (Latgalian: Pasīne or Posīne) is a settlement in Pasiene Parish, Ludza Municipality in the Latgale region of Latvia. It is the easternmost point of Latvia and the easternmost point of the contiguous part of the Baltic states.

As of September 2008, the settlement has a population of 385. Although Pasiene is a small village, it is known for its Baroque-style Roman Catholic church dating from 1761. There also used to be a Dominican abbey in Pasiene, close to the church, but it burnt down in 1837.

References 

Towns and villages in Latvia
Ludza Municipality
Lyutsinsky Uyezd
Latgale